St Mary's Church is located in the village of Great Blakenham near Ipswich. It is an active Anglican parish church in the deanery of Bosmere, part of the archdeaconry of Ipswich, and the Diocese of St Edmundsbury and Ipswich.

St Mary's Church was listed at Grade I on 9 December 1955.

See also 
Grade I listed buildings in Suffolk

References

External links

Church of England church buildings in Suffolk
Grade I listed churches in Suffolk